The Bavarian Auto Group is an Egyptian enterprise for manufacturing and selling BMW vehicles on the local market. The headquarters of the BAG is located in the Kattameya. The assembly plant of the company is located in 6th of October City. It has a partnership with Indian car manufacturer Mahindra & Mahindra to sell the latter’s car in Egypt.

Al Fotouh Company for Vehicle Assembly
The Al Fotouh Company for Vehicle Assembly or short ACVA, was the first step from BMW to manufacturing its vehicles in Egypt alone. It was founded in November 1999 in a small provisional assembling plant near to the current BAG plant. The production line were adopted from the former Egyptian BMW manufacturer Modern Motors in Cairo.

BAG products

BMW

Former Models

Brilliance Motors

Current models

Former models

JinBei

Mahindra

External links 
Bavarian Auto Group website
Bavarian Auto Trading Company (BMW Egypt) website
Brilliance Motors in Egypt
JinBei in Egypt
Mahindra in Egypt
Mini in Egypt

Vehicle manufacturing companies established in 2003
Car manufacturers of Egypt
Manufacturing companies based in Cairo
BMW
Auto dealerships
Joint ventures
Egyptian companies established in 2003